The Department of Transport and Planning (DTP) is  a government department in Victoria, Australia. Commencing operation on 1 January 2019 as the Department of Transport (DOT), the DOT was formed in machinery of government changes made by Premier Daniel Andrews after the re-election of his Labor government at the 2018 Victorian state election. The re-shuffle saw the "super-ministry" Department of Economic Development, Jobs, Transport and Resources abolished and its functions reassigned to the DOT and Department of Jobs, Precincts and Regions.

The department is responsible for ongoing operation and coordination of the state's transport networks, as well as the delivery of new and upgraded transport infrastructure. It also absorbed most functions of VicRoads and Public Transport Victoria on 1 July 2019. On 1 January 2023, after the 2022 Victorian state election, the department absorbed the planning functions of Department of Environment, Land, Water and Planning and was renamed to its current name.

The DTP supports four ministers in the third Andrews Ministry, holding five ministerial portfolios: Jacinta Allan, Minister for Transport and Infrastructure, Melissa Horne, Minister for Public Transport and Minister for Ports and Freight, Ben Carroll, Minister for Roads and Minister for Road Safety and the Transport Accident Commission and Sonya Kilkenny, Minister for Planning.

History

Background 
Transport in Victoria has been managed by various government departments across different ministries. Following each state election, the Premier issues a Machinery of Government instrument, outlining how government responsibilities will be overseen by ministers and the organisation of the bureaucracy.

The first Victorian government agency with a unified approach to transport planning was the Ministry of Transport, formed in 1951 as the earliest precursor to the current DOT. Renamed as the 'Department of Transport' in 1996, the agency underwent numerous changes in organisational structure. Transport responsibilities were merged under the Department of Infrastructure under the Kennett Government until the second incarnation of the Department of Transport was formed in 2008.

The department was replaced by Department of Transport, Planning and Local Infrastructure in April 2013, and then the Department of Economic Development, Jobs, Transport and Resources in January 2015. Further changes were announced with the establishment of Transport for Victoria in June 2016 to provide a "new central transport agency to coordinate Victoria’s growing transport system and plan for its future".

Establishment 
After the November 2018 re-election of the Andrews government, machinery of government changes divided the functions of the Department of Economic Development, Jobs, Transport and Resources into two new departments. The Department of Transport absorbed all of the former department's transport functions. Jacinta Allan, who had been public transport minister in the previous structure, was promoted to a new role of Minister for Transport Infrastructure to lead the new department's focus on major road and rail projects.

The new department was formally established on 1 January 2019, with Paul Younis as acting Secretary. On 26 March, he was confirmed as a permanent appointment to the position. As Secretary, Younis also held the position of acting Head, Transport for Victoria, an office established under section 64A of the Transport Integration Act 2010.

In the days following Younis' permanent appointment, the government announced a major restructure of its transport agencies, with statutory authorities VicRoads and Public Transport Victoria to be abolished as independent entities and incorporated into the Department of Transport. Government ministers claimed that the merger was a more modern approach to integrated transport planning; however, media reports and the state Opposition suggested that the changes were an attempt to reduce transparency and obscure cost overruns on major projects. The move received support from the Rail, Tram and Bus Union, but was opposed by the Australian Services Union, representing many VicRoads staff. The Public Transport Users Association offered its cautious support for the changes, saying that although integration of planning functions was a positive, the merger risked creating an entrenched and inaccessible bureaucracy.

The restructure took effect on 1 July 2019. All functions of the PTV and VicRoads were transferred to the Department of Transport, with the exception of VicRoad's registration and licensing functions and some heavy vehicle functions.

Planning functions
After the Andrews government was re-elected at the 2022 Victorian state election, the planning functions of the Department of Environment, Land, Water and Planning were merged into the DOT on 1 January 2023, and the department was renamed to the Department of Transport and Planning.

Ministers 
, the DTP supports four ministers in the following portfolios:

Functions 
The DTP had responsibility for the following policy areas:
 Public transport, including:
 Metropolitan trains
 Trams
 Buses
 Regional transport
 Roads
 Taxi industry and other commercial passenger vehicles
 Maritime affairs
 Transport infrastructure 
 Road safety
 Walking and cycling
 Planning (since January 2023)
 Property and land titles (since January 2023)

Agencies

Sector transport agencies 

Public Transport Development Authority was also an agency of DOT until its abolition in July 2019. Road Safety Victoria was formed in August 2019.

Major Transport Infrastructure Authority 

The Major Transport Infrastructure Authority (MTIA) was established on 1 January 2019 as an administrative office of the DOT, replacing the former independent administrative offices governing various infrastructure projects. It is led by Director-General Corey Hannett – formerly Coordinator-General of the project authorities – who is responsible to the Minister for Transport Infrastructure, Jacinta Allan. MTIA was declared a transport body under the Transport Integration Act 2010 in August 2019.

Project teams within the MTIA, which were former independent administrative offices, are:
Level Crossing Removal Project - formerly Level Crossing Removal Authority
North East Link Project - formerly North East Link Authority
West Gate Tunnel Project - formerly Western Distributor Authority and West Gate Tunnel Authority
Major Road Projects Victoria - formerly Major Road Projects Authority
Rail Projects Victoria - formally Melbourne Metro Rail Authority

Suburban Rail Loop Authority

The Suburban Rail Loop Authority was established in September 2019 as an administrative office of the DOT. It coordinates and plans the delivery of Suburban Rail Loop.

References

External links 
Department of Transport and Planning website
Victoria's Big Build – Major Transport Infrastructure Authority website

Transport
Transport in Victoria (Australia)
Ministries established in 2019
2019 establishments in Australia
Victoria